Special X was a Commercial-Free channel on XM Satellite Radio that played Novelty music with a "weirdness" theme. the Special X channel was on Channel 30 on XM Radio and on Channel 848 on DirecTV. In its early days, the channel was hosted by a character named Generalissimo Stacio Ortega, a creation of station programmer Lou Brutus. Some of its featured content included "Parrot Training Records," "Wax My Woody" (surf music), "Polka Party," "Wabbit Trax" (cartoon music), along with syndicated content such as Dr. Demento. During certain holidays such as St. Patrick's Day and Halloween, Special X would change its programming to feature related music. On Dr. Martin Luther King, Jr. Day, they broadcast all historical recordings and testimonials, including three original ones from XM programmers Russ Davis (Audio Visions and Beyond Jazz), BK Kirkland (The Groove), and Bill Wax (Bluesville).

The channel would temporarily change its name to "Special XMas" during the Christmas season and play nonstop offbeat holiday music and programming, from songs like "Grandma Got Run Over By a Reindeer" to shorts like "A Very (Charlton) Heston Christmas".

In January 2004 at the Consumer Electronics Show (CES), XM announced that several channels would be eliminated to make way for new programming including Special X, which would end programming on February 1. During the final few weeks of broadcast, station host Generalissimo Stacio Ortega was featured in vignettes that satired the decision to discontinue the station by the "figureheads" and made reference to the message board campaigns that fans were raising to convince XM not to eliminate Special X.

On the final night of air, a six-hour special was played featuring a compilation of the best of programming from Special X. In-between songs, The Generalissimo would update listeners on the war involving his final stand against the "enemy" who was trying to yank him from the air. The "enemy" made their way into the bunker and Generalissimo was finally killed in Tony Montana fashion, only to wake up and realizing it was all a dream (now parodying The Wizard of Oz.) The final segment involved the Generalissimo promising that the "army of weirdness" would rise again. Following the conclusion, Special X left the air and was replaced with The Blend on XM 25. Program Director Lou Brutus would go on to program for Fungus on XM 53, one of the new stations announced at CES.

Following the demise of Special X, some of its featured content was moved to other channels. "Wax My Woody" was moved to 60s on 6 while Dr. Demento was moved to Deep Tracks. "Special XMas" continued to appear annually in the XM lineup during the Christmas season as it had when Special X was broadcast.

Later that year, Special X would return as an online-exclusive channel to XM's new online streaming service. However, the channel lacked the hosts and special programming that it had on satellite and only aired music and programming on auto-pilot. On April 17, 2006, Special X moved from XMRO 30 to XMRO 154 in order to make room for XM Hitlist. It continued to be heard on XMRO 154 and on DirecTV channel 848.

In mid-July 2008, all XM online-only channels were terminated during the XM/Sirius merger, and Special X was included in this purging. The "Special XMas" channel was also omitted from the satellite lineup that year.

See also
XM Satellite Radio channel history

References

Defunct radio stations in the United States
Radio stations established in 2001
Radio stations disestablished in 2008